De Witt Township is a township in Clinton County, Iowa, USA.  As of the 2000 census, its population was 6,346.

History
De Witt Township was organized in 1843. It is named for DeWitt Clinton.

Geography
According to the USGS, it contains two cemeteries: Elmwood and Saint Joseph.

Crystal Lake is within this township. The streams of Ames Creek, Crystal Creek, Rock Creek and Silver Creek run through this township.  The Ames Creek Bridge, which carries 300th St. over Ames Creek, is listed on the National Register of Historic Places.

Notes

References
 USGS Geographic Names Information System (GNIS)

External links
 US-Counties.com
 City-Data.com

Townships in Clinton County, Iowa
Townships in Iowa
1843 establishments in Iowa Territory